The Matwa Qureshi are a Muslim community found in the state of Gujarat in India and a province of Sindh in Pakistan. They are one of a number of communities of pastoral nomads found in the Banni region of Kutch. Also Found in the Rajkot, Morbi, Jamnagar Gondal, Jetpur, Dhoraji, Junagadh, Jodiya, Kalavad The community is also known as simply Matwa Qureshi.

History and origin

The community traces its descent from a small number of Qureshi Arabs who arrived in Kutch during the 12th Century. They got the name Matwa, which means cattle owner, when they took up the occupation of cattle breeding. Being Maldhari nomads, they are now distinct from other Gujarati Shaikh groups, who are either town dwellers or settled agriculturists. They have several clans, the main ones are the Bijani, Lakhani, Dosani, Thariyani, Musani, Nakiyani, Jindani, Balani, Saliyani, Ladhani and Paryani. All these clans have equal status and intermarry. They are an endogamous community, only marrying other Maldhari Muslim communities, such as the Mutwa.

Present circumstances

The Qureshi are a community of Maldhari cattle breeders. They take their cattle to bazaars of Bhuj. In addition to cattle rearing, they also raise goats and buffaloes. Like other Kutchi communities, many of them have migrated to other parts of India in search of employment. They are Sunni Muslims and most follow the Sheikh Ghous Bahauddin Zakariya Multani Tradition. Like other Maldhari communities, they speak Kutchi with several Sindhi loanwords.

See also

Matwa Maldhari
Gujarati Qureshi
Qureshi

References

Social groups of Gujarat
Tribes of Kutch
Maldhari communities
Muslim communities of India
Sindhi tribes
Muslim communities of Gujarat
Social groups of Sindh